Taytalura is an extinct genus of lepidosauromorph reptile from the Late Triassic of Argentina. It contains a single species, Taytalura alcoberi, which is based on a well-preserved skull from the late Carnian Ischigualasto Formation. Although Taytalura did not belong to any group of modern lepidosaurs, micro-CT scanning reveals features of the skull previously only seen in sphenodontians (tuatara and kin). This suggests that the ancestral condition of the skull in lepidosaurs was more similar to sphenodontians than to squamates (lizards and kin).

References 

Late Triassic reptiles of South America
Triassic lepidosauromorphs
Fossil taxa described in 2021
Prehistoric reptile genera
Triassic Argentina